Material flow management (MFM) is a method of efficiently managing materials.

The triad of environmental, social and economical orientation makes MFM a tool of high importance in the field of sustainable development and circular economy.
 
Seen historically, material flow management is a tool that can be understood as an implementation-orientated advancement of the methodology of material flow analysis (MFA). MFM was established as a policy tool after the UN Earth Summit conference in Rio de Janeiro 1992. The German Bundestag outlined the targets and specific goals of MFM in a special report by an Enquete Commission.

See also
 Material flow accounting

References

Materials
Industrial ecology
Sustainability and environmental management